Noël Regney (born Léon Schlienger; 19 August 1922 – 22 November 2002), was a French World War II veteran and songwriter who is best known for composing the Christmas standard "Do You Hear What I Hear?" with his then-wife Gloria Shayne Baker in 1962. Originally from Alsace, France, he moved to New York City and then eventually Connecticut.

Life and career
He was born Léon Schlienger in Strasbourg, Alsace, France. Léon Schlienger, written backwards, is Noël Regnei (-lhcS). He grew up Catholic, but later became a Unitarian Universalist. He was drafted into the Nazi army despite being a Frenchman like many other "Malgré-nous". As an Alsatian, he spoke the German dialect Alsatian as fluently as French. It is said that he soon deserted, joined a group of French Resistance fighters, and became a double agent working for the French. He led a party of Nazis into an ambush, was shot in the arm, but survived. Eventually, while touring the United States, accompanying Lucienne Boyer, contemporary of Édith Piaf, he met his first wife pianist/composer Gloria Shayne with whom in 1962, he composed the Christmas song "Do You Hear What I Hear?"

Regney and Shayne also composed "Rain, Rain, Go Away", "Sweet Little Darlin'", and "What's The Use of Crying". He led an ensemble that backed Kay Lande's vocals on For Sleepyheads Only (1962). He wrote the English lyrics for The Singing Nun (Soeur Sourire)'s famous song "Dominique", the very name of his second wife, Dominique Gillain, though that is not to say that he co-wrote the song, which he had claimed. Together he and Gillain had a son Matthieu, born in 1982. Regney wrote the book and music for a musical biography of French writer Colette as well as other musicals: "Merrimount" and "Landsake". He knew the composers Darius Milhaud and Arthur Honegger; studied with Olivier Messiaen; may have studied with Honegger, and worked at Le Lido in Paris. In the mid-1960s, he led a group known as the Noel Regney Singers that released a children's album featuring folk songs in French and English called "Songs that Help You Learn French". There was a Spanish-English version as well.

Noël died on 22 November 2002 in Brewster, New York, of complications from Pick's disease.

References

External links
 Noel Regney obituary

People from Ridgefield, Connecticut
2002 deaths
French male songwriters
Deaths from Pick's disease
Deaths from dementia in New York (state)
1922 births
20th-century French male musicians
German Army personnel of World War II
French Resistance members
Deserters
French emigrants to the United States